Rugulina fragilis is a species of sea snail, a marine gastropod mollusc in the family Pendromidae.

Description
The length of the shell of the Rugulina Fragilis varies between 1.4 mm and 4 mm.

Distribution
This marine species occurs off Greenland, Iceland, the Faroes and Norway

References

External links
  Serge GOFAS, Ángel A. LUQUE, Joan Daniel OLIVER,José TEMPLADO & Alberto SERRA (2021) - The Mollusca of Galicia Bank (NE Atlantic Ocean); European Journal of Taxonomy 785: 1–114
 

Pendromidae
Gastropods described in 1878